Nathalie Tauziat was the defending champion but lost in the semifinals to Monica Seles.

Seles won in the final 6–0, 6–2 against Mary Joe Fernández.

Seeds
A champion seed is indicated in bold text while text in italics indicates the round in which that seed was eliminated. The top four seeds received a bye to the second round.

  Monica Seles (champion)
  Conchita Martínez (quarterfinals)
  Jana Novotná (semifinals)
  Chanda Rubin (second round)
  Lindsay Davenport (second round)
  Mary Joe Fernández (final)
  Kimiko Date (first round)
  Mary Pierce (first round)

Qualifying

Draw

Final

Section 1

Section 2

External links
 1996 Direct Line International Championships Draw

Eastbourne International
1996 WTA Tour